Bao Nguyen (born 1980) is an American Democratic politician from Orange County, California, and a former mayor of Garden Grove, California. He also previously served as a trustee on the Garden Grove Unified School District Board of Education.

Early life and education
Nguyen was born in a United Nations refugee camp in Thailand to parents escaping Vietnam, and arrived in the United States when he was 3 months old. He attended school within the Garden Grove Unified School District. He attended Garden Grove High School, and graduated from Pacifica High School.

Nguyen graduated from UC Irvine with a bachelor's degree in political science. As an undergraduate, he interned for the White House Initiative on Asian Americans and Pacific Islanders in Rockville, Maryland. Nguyen also earned a master's degree in Indo-Tibetan Buddhist studies from Naropa University.

Political career
Nguyen was appointed to the Garden Grove Unified School District Board of Education in 2011, after a close race in 2010. He was elected as a trustee in 2012, and served a term as vice president. As a board member, he fought against the exclusion of LGBT Vietnamese from the annual Little Saigon Tết Parade. He resigned from the Board of Trustees in 2014 due to becoming mayor.

Nguyen defeated incumbent Bruce Broadwater by 15 votes in the 2014 election to become mayor of Garden Grove. He also became the first Vietnamese-American mayor of the city. As mayor, he sought to improve government transparency and accountability, and to engage voters by making city finance records available online. Nguyen was appointed by the state governor to the Orange County Fair and Event Center Board of Directors. He resigned the position in 2015.

The president of the Garden Grove Police Association, a political opponent of Nguyen, "surreptitiously recorded a conversation" in June 2015 with Nguyen, then newly elected mayor. According to the OC Weekly, "during the discussion, Nguyen called [Garden Grove] City Councilman Phat Bui 'a fucking dick,' a reference to efforts by Bui's supporters to label Nguyen a communist sympathizer for not vehemently protesting Riverside's sister-city relationship with Can Tho, Vietnam". Nguyen stated the insinuation was inaccurate and that he simply "didn't think one city council should tell another what to do".

In the 2016 elections Nguyen ran for congress in California's 46th district, long held by Loretta Sanchez, with former California State Senate member Lou Correa as his opponent. In the June primary Nguyen came in second with 14.6% of the vote after Correa received 43.7%. In the November Nguyen lost to Correa after receiving just under 30% of the vote in the general election.

Nguyen's term as Garden Grove mayor ended in December 2016, and he was succeeded by council member/Mayor Pro Tem, Steve Jones.

References

External links
 Mayoral biography at the City of Garden Grove website
 Congressional campaign website

1980 births
California Democrats
University of California, Irvine alumni
Living people
California politicians of Vietnamese descent
American mayors of Asian descent
LGBT mayors of places in the United States
Gay politicians
Naropa University alumni
American LGBT rights activists
21st-century American politicians
Mayors of places in California
American LGBT people of Asian descent
Activists from California
LGBT people from California
People from Garden Grove, California
21st-century LGBT people